Minuscule 2446 (in the Gregory-Aland numbering), is a Greek minuscule manuscript of the New Testament on parchment. Dated paleografically to the 12th century. The manuscript has complex contents.

Description 

The codex contains a complete text of the four Gospels, on 320 parchment leaves (16.8 cm by 12.8 cm). The text is written in one column per page, in 22 lines per page.

Kurt Aland did not place it in any Category. Wisse did not examine it by using the Claremont Profile Method.

The codex now is located in the Bible Museum Münster (Ms. 6).

See also 

 List of New Testament minuscules (2001–)
 Textual criticism
 Bible Museum Münster

References

External links 

 Manuscripts of the Bible Museum
 Images of manuscript 2446 at the CSNTM

Greek New Testament minuscules
12th-century biblical manuscripts